Cootawundy in Central Darling Shire is a remote rural locality and civil parish of Yungnulgra County in far North West New South Wales.

The Parish has an arid landscape, with extremely hot summers and mild winters. The parish has a Köppen climate classification of BWh (Hot desert). is almost unpopulated, with less than two inhabitants per square kilometer.

The nearest town to Cootawundy is Whitecliffs.

References

Localities in New South Wales